Kathleen Grace Noble (born 20 December 1994) is a Ugandan rower who is recognized as the first Ugandan to qualify for rowing at the Olympics in the Women's Single Scull. She is also recognized as having achieved Uganda's best time so far (30.80 seconds) in the 50m butterfly at the FINA World Swimming Championships.

Background and education 
Noble was born in Kiwoko Hospital, in the present-day Nakaseke District to Irish parents, Gerry Noble, a doctor, and Moira Noble, a teacher who had come to Uganda as missionaries. Noble attended the then Kabira International School (now Kampala International School) between 1999 and 2004. She later joined the International School of Uganda for secondary in 2004, leaving in 2013. She then joined Princeton University in 2014 and graduated with a degree in Ecology and Evolutionary Biology.

Career 
Based in Utah, she works as a technician in the Schiffman Lab at the Huntsman Cancer Institute in Salt Lake City.

Swimming and other sports 
Noble initially was a swimmer representing her high school and Uganda with 50M butterfly and 50M freestyle as her specialty. Noble was part of the Ugandan team at the 2012 World Swimming Championship in Istanbul, Turkey. In addition, she played volleyball and represented the International School of Uganda in the ISSEA (International Schools of South and East Africa) competitions between 2009 and 2012.

Rowing and Olympic qualification 
After moving to Princeton, Noble got interested in rowing through her room-mate and featured for the Princeton Tigers. In preparation for the 2016 World Championships, Noble took a semester off to train with the Ugandan team. She was recruited and trained under William Mwanga with the Maroons Aqua Sports Club, where she learned how to row in a single boat. According to a Ugandan sports website, Kawowo Sports, Noble's maiden rowing championship for Uganda was during the 2016 World Rowing U-23 event held in Rotterdam, Holland.

After graduating from university, she moved to Utah, working as a wilderness therapy field instructor working with youth in the desert, teaching survival and communication skills, and resumed training with the Utah Crew under coach Linda Iqbal. She qualified for the 2020 Olympics after winning the 2 km single scull race at the 2019 Africa Rowing Regatta held in Tunisia.

See also 

 Uganda at the 2020 Summer Olympics
 Rowing at the 2020 Summer Olympics
 Jamila Lunkuse
 Olivia Aya Nakitanda
 List of Ugandan records in swimming
 International School of Uganda
 Princeton Tigers

References

External links 
 
 Kathleen Noble (Princeton Tigers)
 Uganda Swimming Federation
 Official website of Utah Crew
 Official website of International Schools of Southern and Eastern Africa
 Princeton University Athletics

1994 births
Living people
People from Nakaseke District
Ugandan people of Irish descent
Ugandan people of British descent
Ugandan female swimmers
Ugandan female rowers
Rowers at the 2020 Summer Olympics
Olympic rowers of Uganda
Princeton University alumni
Princeton Tigers women's rowers
Ugandan expatriates in the United States
20th-century Ugandan women
21st-century Ugandan women